The Cathedral of the Holy Saviour of Congo Also Former Cathedral of the Holy Saviour of Congo It is the name given to an old Catholic church built at the end of the 15th century in the capital of the Kingdom of the Congo, it was one of the first Catholic cathedrals in sub-Saharan Africa and in what is now known as Angola.

The construction as a simple church of which later would be cathedral, was initiated towards 1491, under João I of Portugal, concretely, and according to the documents of the time, between the 6 of May 1491 and the 6 of July of the same year; Later it would be repaired and extended by 1534, under the reign of Afonso I. By 1570, under the reign of Álvaro I of Kongo, the East Jagas towns briefly took the city, burning the church, which was later rebuilt.

It was elevated to the status of cathedral in 1596, already under the king Álvaro II of the Congo. This same monarch tried in 1613, through Pope Paul V, that the king of Portugal took care of the cost of the maintenance of the bishops and canons of the cathedral.

The city was sacked several times during the civil wars that followed the Battle of Mbwila of 1665, the first of them in 1668, and was abandoned in 1678, after being destroyed by the troops of the pretender to the throne Pedro III, leaving the Cathedral in ruins.

See also

Roman Catholicism in Angola
Holy Saviour

References

Roman Catholic cathedrals in Angola
Roman Catholic churches completed in 1491
15th-century Roman Catholic church buildings